Gunnar Bryde Syverstad, BEM (6 February 1910 – 11 March 1945) was a Norwegian resistance member. He is known for his assistance in the Norwegian heavy water sabotage.

He was born in Horten, Norway. his mother was from that city and his father was from Glemmen in Østfold county. He later moved to Rjukan where he was laboratory assistant at the Vemork hydroelectric power plant outside Rjukan in Tinn, Norway.

He fled to Great Britain in February 1944, where he became a member of the Special Operations Executive. He returned to Norway, being parachuted in over Hardangervidda, to participate in the Operation Sunshine with Leif Tronstad. Syverstad and Tronstad were both killed in a shooting incident 11 March 1945. He was posthumously awarded the British Empire Medal.

References

Other sources
Jensen, Erling; Per Ratvik; Ragnar Ulstein  (1948) Kompani Linge   
Berg, John (1986) Soldaten som ikke ville gi seg'  (Metope)  
Poulsson, Jens-Anton  (1944-1945) Tungtvannssabotasjen, kampen om atombomben 1942-1944   
Dahl, Per F. (1999) Heavy water and the wartime race for nuclear energy'' (Taylor & Francis)  

1910 births
1945 deaths
People from Horten
Norwegian military personnel killed in World War II
Norwegian resistance members
Norwegian Special Operations Executive personnel
People from Telemark
Recipients of the British Empire Medal
Deaths by firearm in Norway